Eve Biddle (born 1982) is a contemporary American artist and co-founder and co-director of the arts organization The Wassaic Project. With her husband, Joshua Frankel, she creates public art murals including Queens is the Future and print art for exhibition. She is also a member of the board at Working Assumptions, a foundation dedicated to the intersection of art and family, best known for its photographic depictions of pregnant women at work.

Early life 
Biddle was born and raised in the Lower East Side of Manhattan, the daughter of noted American sculptor Mary Ann Unger and photographer Geoffrey Biddle. She attended Williams College.

Work 
With her husband, Joshua Frankel, she has created large-scale murals like Queens is the Future and digital art, including "Thanks," a digital billboard visible from Truck Route 9 in Kearny, New Jersey thanking essential workers for their efforts during the COVID-19 pandemic.

The Wassaic Project, of which Biddle is a co-founder and co-director, has been in operation since 2008 in the hamlet of Wassaic within the town of Amenia, New York. Artforum has described the Wassaic Project as a "surprisingly ambitious exhibition and residency complex."

References 

People from the Lower East Side
1982 births
Living people
Williams College alumni
Phillips Exeter Academy alumni
American muralists
Artists from New York City